The Mohican are a Native American tribe who lived in and around the Hudson Valley.

Mohican may also refer to:

Native Americans
 Mohegan, a Native American tribe based in Southeastern Connecticut

Hairstyles
 Mohawk hairstyle, also known as "Mohican hairstyle" in British English

Places
 The Mohican River in Ohio in the United States
 Mohican State Park, which includes some of the river
 Mohican Falls, one of 24 named waterfalls in Ricketts Glen State Park in Pennsylvania in the United States
 The Mohican Brook in Otsego County, New York in the United States

Ships
USS Mohican, various United States Navy ships
Mohican II, one of Lake George Steamboat Company ships in Lake George, New York

See also
 The Last of the Mohicans, a novel by James Fenimore Cooper

es:Mohicanos